RDD may refer to:

Adygeya Airlines, by ICAO airline designator
Radar detector detector
Radiological dispersion device, a weapon designed to spread radioactive material
Rally for Democracy and Development (Rassemblement pour la Démocratie et le Développement), a political party in the Republic of the Congo
Random digit dialing, a method for selecting people for involvement in telephone surveys
Redding Municipal Airport (IATA airport code), a public airport near Redding, California
Regression discontinuity design, a statistical technique 
Replaceable Database Driver (or Replicable Database Driver), a component of computer software that performs database operations, supported by languages such as Clipper
Renault Driver Development, a program created by Renault F1 to support young racing drivers
Resilient Distributed Dataset, the central data structure of Apache Spark
Responsibility-driven design, a software development methodology in which the system is modeled as a collection of objects that collaborate to fulfill the responsibilities
Riddlesdown railway station (National Rail station code), London, England
Rosai–Dorfman disease, a disorder characterized by abundant histiocytes in lymph nodes and elsewhere in the body
Rubber duck debugging, an informal term used in software engineering for a method of debugging code